The Dark Wind is a 1991 American mystery drama film based on The Dark Wind by Tony Hillerman, one of a series of mysteries set against contemporary Navajo life in the Southwest. It stars Lou Diamond Phillips as Jim Chee and Fred Ward as Joe Leaphorn.

Synopsis
As Officer Jim Chee (Lou Diamond Phillips) watches a windmill, trying to catch the vandal repeatedly sabotaging it, a small plane crashes nearby.  Thus begins a tangled story involving not only the vandalism and the crash, but also murder, drug smuggling, and burglary. Officer Chee is suspected by the FBI when drugs known to have been on the plane are missing.

Cast
 Lou Diamond Phillips as Officer Jim Chee
 Fred Ward as Lt. Joe Leaphorn
 John Karlen as Jake West
 Gary Farmer as Deputy Cowboy Albert Dashee
 Michelle Thrush as Shirley Topaha
 Guy Boyd as Agent Johnson
 Blake Clark as Ben Gaines
 Gary Basaraba as Larry

Reception
It was directed by Errol Morris, a documentary film-maker making his dramatic feature debut. Robert Redford was executive producer, hoping for a series of films, but he was unhappy with the production and director. In an article on the successful adaptation of Skinwalkers in 2002, Redford said of The Dark Wind, "That was a false start. It was miscast. It was ill-conceived and I didn't think it was the right beginning for the series. It wasn't distributed."

Director Errol Morris did not finish the film due to "artistic differences" with Redford.

References

External links
 
 
 

1991 television films
1991 films
1990s mystery films
1990s crime films
Films about Native Americans
1991 multilingual films
Navajo-language films
Hopi-language films
Carolco Pictures films
Films directed by Errol Morris
Films set on the Navajo Nation
Films scored by Michel Colombier
Films based on American novels
1990s English-language films